Kjóvadalur is a small valley in the village Sørvágur on the Faroe Islands. Its name translates to 'the valley of the Kjógvi'. Kjógvi is the faroese form for the bird Arctic Skua.

The river Skipá runs through Kjóvadal. Above Kjóvadal lies the mountain Nónfjall.

Valleys of the Faroe Islands

References